Kraig J. Powell (born March 18, 1966 in Tacoma, Washington) was an American politician and a Republican member of the Utah House of Representatives representing District 54 from 2009 to 2016. In October 2016, he was appointed as a judge of the Utah 4th District Court by Utah governor Gary Herbert.

Early life and education
Powell was born in Tacoma, Washington. He earned his BA in English from Willamette University, his MA and PhD in government from the University of Virginia, and his JD from the University of Virginia School of Law.. He worked as an intern for the U.S. Senate Labor Committee, a Senior Law Clerk at the Illinois Supreme Court, a briefing Attorney, Texas Court of Appeals, and a city attorney in Midway, Utah. He now lives in Heber, Utah, with his wife Kim and their four children.

Political career and elections
Kraig was first elected on November 4, 2008.
 2008 - When District 54 Republican Representative Gordon E. Snow left the Legislature and left the seat open, Powell was one of two from among three candidates selected by the Republican convention for the June 24, 2008 Republican primary, which Powell won with 2,052 votes (51.6%) and won the three-way November 4, 2008 General election with 9,353 votes (67.4%) against Democratic nominee Neil Anderton and Constitution candidate Douglas Thompson, who had run for the seat in 2004.
2010 - Powell was unopposed for both the June 22, 2010 Republican Primary and the November 2, 2010 General election, winning with 9,540 votes.
 2012 - Powell was unopposed in the primary elections on June 26, 2012 and won the general election on November 6, 2012 with 9,252 votes (59.3%) defeating democratic nominee Chris Robinson.
 2014 - Powell defeated Wylder Smith in the Republican convention and won the general election on November 4, 2014 with 6,262 votes (61.8%) defeating Democratic nominee Glenn J. Wright.

During the 2016 legislative session, he served on the Public Education Appropriations Subcommittee, Retirement and Independent Entities Appropriations Subcommittee, House Political Subdivisions Committee, the House Retirement and Independent Entities Committee, and the House Education Committee.

2016 sponsored legislation

Powell also floor sponsored two bills: SB0005S01 Retirement and Independent Entities Base Budget, SB0019 Phased Retirement, SB0020 Retirement Systems Audit Recommendations Amendments, SB0024 Utah Housing Corporation Sunset Extension, SB0029 Retirement Systems Amendments, SB0037 Human Resource Management Rate Committee, SB0208 Retirement Amendments, and SB0210S04 Unmanned Vehicle Revisions.

References

External links
Official page at the Utah State Legislature

Kraig Powell at Ballotpedia
Kraig Powell at the National Institute on Money in State Politics
All information for Representative Powell's bills in 2014 can be found here: 

1966 births
Living people
Republican Party members of the Utah House of Representatives
People from Heber City, Utah
University of Virginia alumni
University of Virginia School of Law alumni
Utah lawyers
Willamette University alumni
Politicians from Tacoma, Washington
21st-century American politicians
People from Midway, Utah